Alabama elected its member August 5–6, 1821.

See also 
 1820 and 1821 United States House of Representatives elections
 List of United States representatives from Alabama

References 

1821
Alabama
United States House of Representatives